Cress Williams (born July 26, 1970) is an American actor, known for his roles in Prison Break and Close to Home. His most recent roles include Mayor Lavon Hayes on The CW series Hart of Dixie and the title character on The CW's Black Lightning. Williams is also best known for his recurring role as Terrence "Scooter" Williams on Fox's Living Single and as Inspector Atwon Babcock on Nash Bridges.

Early life and education
Williams was born in Heidelberg, Baden-Württemberg, West Germany, to American parents. He took courses at Fullerton College and earned a Bachelor of Arts degree in theatre from University of California, Los Angeles.

Career
Williams acted in a 1990 Fullerton College production of William Shakespeare's tragedy, Othello, which was directed by Tom Blank. He also acted in another production in the same year at Fullerton College called Red Noses, a black comedy produced by Peter Barnes and directed by Michael Fields.

Williams has appeared on many TV series since 1994, including Star Trek: Deep Space Nine, Beverly Hills, 90210, NYPD Blue, Lois & Clark: The New Adventures of Superman, JAG, Living Single, Nash Bridges, Providence, Law & Order: Special Victims Unit, Veronica Mars, The West Wing, Close to Home, ER, and Grey's Anatomy. He was the fifth cast member in the original pilot for Will & Grace, playing Will's law firm partner, but was dropped during rehearsals because director Jim Burrows said they didn't need his character. He portrayed Talak'talan, a Jem'Hadar leader in the Star Trek series, in a Star Trek: Deep Space Nine episode "The Jem'Hadar". Williams joined the Prison Break cast by playing The Company's assassin, Wyatt Mathewson. He appeared in the final season of Friday Night Lights as Ornette Howard, father of East Dillon's star quarterback Vince Howard. He also starred alongside Rachel Bilson on The CW series Hart of Dixie as former football star turned mayor Lavon Hayes.

From 2018 to 2021, he has ventured back into adaptations of DC Comics: As main character Jefferson Pierce / Black Lightning on The CW's superhero TV series Black Lightning, which was integrated into Arrowverse's prime Earth during Crisis on Infinite Earths, and as John Henry Irons in the animated film The Death of Superman and its 2019 sequel, Reign of the Supermen. After his Black Lightning series concluded, he reprised the role on The Flash at the start of its eighth season as part of its "Armageddon" event.

Personal life 
On October 14, 2000, Williams married actress Simbi Khali in Malibu, California. The couple had two children and divorced in 2011. Williams married girlfriend Kristen Torrianni in June 2013. Williams and Torrianni also have two children together.

Filmography

Film and TV Movies

Television

References

External links

Cress Williams 2018 Interview

1970 births
20th-century American male actors
21st-century American male actors
Living people
Male actors from New York (state)
African-American male actors
American male film actors
American male television actors
20th-century African-American people
21st-century African-American people